Club Defensor Laure Sur (sometimes referred as Defensor Laure Sur) is a Peruvian football club, playing in the city of Chancay, Lima, Peru.

History
The Club Defensor Laure Sur was founded on October 24, 1960.

In the 2015 Copa Perú, the club classified to the National Stage, but was eliminated when finished in 45th place.

In the 2017 Copa Perú, the club classified to the National Stage, but was eliminated by Binacional in the Round of 16.

In the 2018 Copa Perú, the club classified to the Departamental Stage, but was eliminated by Pirata in the Round of 16.

In the 2021 Copa Perú, the club classified to the Regional Stage, but was eliminated by Los Ángeles Negros in the Fase 1.

Honours

Regional
Liga Departamental de Lima:
Winners (2): 2017, 2018
Runner-up (1): 2015

Liga Provincial de Huaral:
Winners (3): 1987, 2015, 2018
Runner-up (2): 2016, 2017

Liga Distrital de Chancay:
Winners (2): 1987, 2017
Runner-up (1): 2015

See also
List of football clubs in Peru
Peruvian football league system

References

External links

Football clubs in Peru
Association football clubs established in 1960